Cundall is a village in the Harrogate district of North Yorkshire, England. It is one of the Thankful Villages that suffered no fatalities during World War I.

Governance

The village lies within the Skipton & Ripon UK Parliamentary Constituency. It is part of the Masham & Fountains electoral division of North Yorkshire County Council. It is also within the Wathvale ward of Harrogate Borough Council. The village is part of the civil parish of Cundall with Leckby.

Geography

The village is recorded in the UK Census of 1821 as having a population of 351. In the 1851 UK Census the population was 389 and in the 1881 UK Census was 301. In the 2001 UK Census the parish had a population of 102, of which 82 were aged over sixteen. Of these, 64 were in employment. There were 42 dwellings of which half were detached properties. The Census 2011 gave a population of 128.

History

The village is mentioned in the Domesday Book of 1086 as Cundel in the Hallikeld hundred. The lord of the manor prior to the Norman invasion was Earl Waltheof and thereafter Alfred the butler under the rule of Robert, Count of Mortain.

The nearest settlements are Asenby  to the north; Dishforth  to the west and Helperby  to the south.

Education

The village is home to Cundall Manor, an independent (fee-paying) co-educational school from ages 2.5 to 16 years of age. State Primary education for the village can be found at Dishforth CE School, Topcliffe CE school or St Peter's Brafferton CE School. Secondary education is at Boroughbridge High School or Thirsk School and Sixth Form College.

Religion

The church in the village is dedicated to St Mary and All Saints. It is a Grade I listed building that was rebuilt in 1854.

References

Villages in North Yorkshire
Borough of Harrogate